The town of Sankheda in Chhota Udaipur district is known for its lacquer work. The work is done on country wood which, being brown, gives darker shades.

It is known for its handcrafted furniture, which is made from teak wood. This furniture is exported to countries all over the world.

Sankheda is located on the banks of the Orsang River. It is located 55 km away from Vadodara. The neighboring towns are Dabhoi (21 km), Bodeli (21 km), and Waghodia (27 km).

Development of this town comes from a huge contribution made by Dr. Jethalal K. Parikh, who worked really hard to provide good education and employment to the local community. There are schools and hospitals named after his wife. The local community appreciates his efforts to develop the town. A road was named after him, and there is a statue of him at the entrance to the town.

Shri Bhikhubhai Shah, who was a freedom fighter and a lawyer, donated agricultural land in the "Bhumidan Movement" by Vinoba Bhave.

High school
The high school is named after D.B. Parekh, who donated money to build it in a time when the town was very poor. The D.B. Parekh High School is still attended by the kids of Sankheda.

See also
 Sankheda furniture

Cities and towns in Chhota Udaipur district
Urban and suburban areas of Vadodara